Gustavo Javier Biscayzacú Perea (born October 5, 1978 in Montevideo, Uruguay), known as Gustavo Biscayzacú and nicknamed grillito (little cricket), is a retired footballer and current manager of Racing Club de Montevideo.

Career 
His debut came on September 14, 1997 with Uruguay club Defensor Sporting and his team won 3–2 against Club Atlético Peñarol.  He then spent time in Australia, Spain, and Chile.  In 2003 with Chilean club Unión Española, Biscayzacú was named by IFFHS as the fourth leading goal scorer of the world for the year with 31 goals.  He has spent time with nine different clubs, most recently with Nacional of Uruguay, where he has the record of being the second player to score a hat-trick in a game versus the archirrival Peñarol. On 6 January 2010, he signed with Associação Portuguesa de Desportos of Brazil.

After a short period in Brazilian club, he signed with Uruguayan club River Plate, and then moved to Colombia, to play for Deportivo Cali.

Coaching career
On 20 January 2020, Biscayzacú was appointed manager of Uruguayan Primera División club Racing Club de Montevideo.

Honours

Club
 Colo-Colo
Primera División de Chile (1): 2007 Clausura

Notes

References

External links
 
 
 

1978 births
Living people
Uruguayan people of Basque descent
Footballers from Montevideo
Uruguayan footballers
Uruguayan football managers
Uruguayan expatriate footballers
National Soccer League (Australia) players
C.D. Veracruz footballers
Atlante F.C. footballers
Club Necaxa footballers
Defensor Sporting players
Melbourne Knights FC players
Deportivo Cali footballers
Deportes Quindío footballers
Real Jaén footballers
Colo-Colo footballers
C.D. Arturo Fernández Vial footballers
Santiago Morning footballers
Unión Española footballers
El Tanque Sisley players
Boston River players
Club Atlético River Plate (Montevideo) players
Uruguayan Primera División players
Primera B de Chile players
Chilean Primera División players
Categoría Primera A players
Liga MX players
Uruguayan expatriate sportspeople in Mexico
Uruguayan expatriate sportspeople in Brazil
Uruguayan expatriate sportspeople in Chile
Uruguayan expatriate sportspeople in Spain
Uruguayan expatriate sportspeople in Colombia
Uruguayan expatriate sportspeople in Australia
Expatriate footballers in Mexico
Expatriate footballers in Brazil
Expatriate footballers in Chile
Expatriate footballers in Spain
Expatriate footballers in Colombia
Expatriate soccer players in Australia
Association football forwards
Racing Club de Montevideo managers
Uruguayan Primera División managers
Uruguayan Segunda División managers